Michael P. Goggin (born March 8, 1963) is an American politician and member of the Minnesota Senate. A member of the Republican Party of Minnesota, he represents District 21 in southeastern Minnesota.

Early life, education, and career
Goggin graduated from Red Wing High School. He attended Gustavus Adolphus College, graduating with a Bachelor of Arts with a major in business administration, and the University of Colorado Denver, graduating with a Bachelor of Science with a major in electrical engineering.

Goggin previously worked for Red Wing Shoes, of which his father, Joe Goggin, was previously its president. He is a project manager at the Prairie Island Nuclear Power Plant.

Minnesota Senate
Goggin was elected to the Minnesota Senate in 2016.

Personal life
Goggin and his wife, Pam, have two children and reside in Red Wing.

References

External links

 Official Senate website
 Official campaign website

Living people
People from Red Wing, Minnesota
Gustavus Adolphus College alumni
University of Colorado Denver alumni
Republican Party Minnesota state senators
21st-century American politicians
1963 births